Juha Leevi Antero Tapio (born 5 February 1974) is a Finnish singer, lyricist, composer and guitarist. His album Mitä silmät ei nää (2003) sold gold and the album Kaunis ihminen (2006) reached platinum. He is married to Raija Mattila, and together they have two sons, Mikael and Akseli.

Tapio won the Best Male Vocalist Emma Award in 2008.

Discography

Albums

Studio albums

Compilation albums

Singles

References

External links
Official site 

1974 births
Living people
People from Vaasa
Finnish songwriters
Folk-pop singers
Finnish pop singers
20th-century Finnish male singers
21st-century Finnish male singers